Shool is a 1999 Indian Hindi-language action crime film directed by Eeshwar Nivas. Written and produced by Ram Gopal Varma, it portrays the politician-criminal nexus and the criminalization of politics in Bihar and its effect on the life of an honest police officer. It stars Manoj Bajpayee as Inspector Samar Pratap Singh and Sayaji Shinde as the borderline psychopath criminal-politician Bachhu Yadav, a character loosely based on politician turned criminal, Surajbhan Singh. The soundtrack consisting of "Main Aayi Hoon U.P. Bihar Lootne" featuring Shilpa Shetty became a chartbuster." The rights to this film are owned by Shah Rukh Khan's Red Chillies Entertainment.

Parts of the film were shot in Motihari, Bihar. The climax of the film was entirely shot at the state Legislative Assembly in Hyderabad. The film won the National Film Award for Best Feature Film in Hindi, and was screened at the International Film Festival of India, and the Toronto International Film Festival. India Today cited the film as the "Best Cop Movie" of the decade.

Plot 

The film opens with a late night telephone call from Patna asking to speak to Bachchu Yadav (Sayaji Shinde), an MLA of the ruling political party in Bihar. His lackeys trace their boss to a prostitute's abode, where he receives the telephone and is informed that his party has selected another MLA for the ticket this time. He wastes no time, reaches the newly selected MLA candidate's home and pressures him to give up his nomination in lieu of money. When intimidation fails, his thugs stab the MLA-candidate under his supervision.

Meanwhile, Inspector Samar Pratap Singh (Manoj Bajpayee) arrives in Motihari, Bihar, where he has been transferred to, with his wife Manjari (Raveena Tandon) and daughter. At the railway station, he gets into a confrontation with a coolie (Rajpal Yadav). The two have a tiff on the payment of Rs. 30/- to be paid to the coolie for his services, which Singh refuses to pay, as he (rightfully) thinks he is being overcharged. As the situation goes to the verge of fisticuffs, a local police hawaldaar intervenes. Not knowing that Singh, too, is a police officer, the hawaldaar tries to manhandle Singh. Infuriated, Singh takes the matter to the police station to which he is posted. As Singh writes a complaint against the hawaldaar for harassing an innocent local (Singh), a sub-inspector, Hussain, intervenes. Hussain asks Singh to forgive the hawaldaar, to which Singh does not relent. Singh later learns that the Motihari police station runs according to Yadav's whims. Singh is an idealist who respects the constitution and the rule of law, and expects that everyone else should do the same. But no one follows the law in Motihari, especially the policemen who receive hafta (illicit weekly payments) from Yadav to do his bidding.

One day, the D.S.P. (Shrivallabh Vyas) asks Singh to break up a fight between two rival gangs and arrest the people who attacked some of Yadav's men. Singh investigates and finds out that Yadav's men are the real culprits. Among them are Sudhir Vinod (Nagesh Bhosle) and Lallan Singh (Yashpal Sharma), so Singh arrests them instead. When the D.S.P. orders Singh to release them, he refuses, saying that he has already registered the case. This is the first time Singh's superior learns of his real character and expresses concern over his future. Sub-inspector Hussain, who shamelessly admits to subjection to Yadav, declares that Singh won't last long in his current job if he continues in his ways. Singh sadly learns the limit of his official prowess, when the court releases Yadav's men.

Yadav demonstrates his limited education when he speaks in the Bihar Legislative Assembly against the construction of a hydro-electric dam on the river Ganges, as it would be "stealing" electricity from the water to the disadvantage of the farmers; he misquotes the famous political slogan "Jai Jawan Jai Kisan".

Singh finds himself alone in his fight and against the odds of a corrupt and rotten system. One day, while buying vegetables in the local market, he sees three young men sitting on a wall teasing passing girls by singing lewd Bhojpuri songs; when he confronts them, they react defiantly to Singh (who is in plainclothes). However, on learning that he is the S.H.O., two of them become defensive and tell him meekly that they are students of M.S. College, but the third declares proudly that he is the younger brother of Pranav Thakur, another influential politician, hoping that Singh will be impressed, but Singh retorts with a slap and forces him to apologise to the girls.

On his way home, Yadav decides to give an interview to a female journalist who boldly asks him if he is a murderer. Yadav, understandably, gets annoyed and tries to confuse and intimidate her, and upon failing to do so, simply asks her to get out of his car.

Yadav gets irritated by Singh's methods, particularity, because he arrested his men. He decides to annoy him and organises his own marriage anniversary. Singh reaches the scene and asks to see the required permission papers for operating loudspeakers late into the night. When no such official papers are produced, Singh seizes the music system and disrupts the party. Yadav confronts him and asks to be forgiven (in a patronising and satiric manner). The inebriated D.S.P., who is also present at the party, tries to cool Singh's tempers by telling him such rules are inconsequential in small villages. Singh refuses to yield, which angers the D.S.P. who gives Singh a direct order to let the matter go. Singh stands firm, and states that he will let the situation go only if given written orders. The following morning, the act of defiance by Singh causes a heated debate between Singh and the D.S.P., who, with the help of the corrupt sub-inspector Hussain, frames Singh for a physical attack on his senior. Tiwari (Vineet Kumar) tries to help Singh but in vain and Singh is suspended from his post.

Yadav and his men decide to land the final blow on Singh and finish him once and for all, with his goons passing disgustingly indecent comments towards Singh's daughter at a market, causing Singh to lose his temper and single-handedly beating them. One of the henchman attacks Singh with a heavy wooden club, but instead bludgeons Singh's daughter on her head, killing her.

When the badly injured Laljee goes to Yadav and tells him that Singh has beaten them badly, Yadav, who cares next to nothing even about his most loyal men, finds it a golden opportunity to accuse Singh. He immediately takes a shotgun from the wall and hits Laljee on the head forcefully enough to kill him, and then orders his henchmen to register a complaint that Laljee actually died because of the beating by Singh. The police waste no time and arrest Singh while he is still grieving over his daughter's dead body. Singh's parents come to help him, and his father (Virendra Saxena) pleads with Yadav to get him released. Yadav uses this situation to his advantage and gets Singh released by asking one of his henchmen to testify. When Singh realises that Yadav was behind his release, he insults Yadav.

A few days later, Singh's parents leave, and he has a big fight with his wife, who holds his idealism to blame for the quagmire they find themselves in, including their daughter's death. She asks him why he won't kill Yadav if he's as brave as he pretends to be. Singh tells her he's afraid for her sake, and leaves in a huff. Manjari tries to commit suicide with an overdose of sleeping pills. Singh's only true friend in town, the honest sub-inspector Tiwari, informs Singh about Manjari's suicide attempt and both rush to the hospital. Singh manages to speak a few sentences of comfort with her, where she absolves him of his guilt and asks him to avenge her and their daughter, before she dies.

Singh, having lost the woman he loved; feels he has lost everything and has nothing to live for anymore. He goes home, readies himself and wears his police uniform, visits the police station and snatches his service weapon in spite of sub-inspector Hussain's warning. Hussain pulls out his gun, but Singh kills him and makes way to Patna, where the state legislature is in session. He enters the well of the house, defying heavy security. Singh finds Yadav and drags him by his collar to the Speaker's dais. After an emotional appeal to members of parliament on the leadership crisis and criminalisation of politics, he shoots Yadav in the head, declares his patriotism and yells "Jai Hind" twice.

Cast 

 Manoj Bajpayee as Inspector Samar Pratap Singh
 Raveena Tandon as Manjari Pratap Singh, Samar's wife
 Sayaji Shinde as Bacchu "Bhaiyaji" Yadav
 Vineet Kumar as Inspector Tiwari
 Ganesh Yadav as Inspector Hussain
 Virendra Saxena as Prabal Pratap Singh, Samar's father 
 Nandu Madhav as Laljee Yadav
 Sandeep Kulkarni as Gopaljee
 Nagesh Bhosle as Sudhir Vinod
 Yashpal Sharma as Lallan Singh
 Shri Vallabh Vyas as DSP
 Rajpal Yadav as Violent Coolie (special appearance)
 Pratima Kazmi as Bacchu Yadav's mother
 Nawazuddin Siddiqui as Waiter (special appearance)
 Shilpa Shetty as the dancer in the item number "Main Aayi Hoon U. P. Bihar Lootne"

Soundtrack

Awards 
National Film Awards 1999
 National Film Award for Best Feature Film in Hindi - Ram Gopal Varma

Filmfare Awards
 Filmfare Critics Award for Best Performance, 2000 – Manoj Bajpai.

Screen Awards
Star Screen Award for Best Villain, 2000 – Sayaji Shinde.

References

External links 
 

1990s Hindi-language films
Films about corruption in India
Fictional portrayals of the Bihar Police
Indian political thriller films
1990s political thriller films
Films set in India
1999 crime drama films
1999 films
Films set in Bihar
Films scored by Shankar–Ehsaan–Loy
1990s crime action films
Political action films
Indian films about revenge
Indian crime action films
Indian crime drama films
Best Hindi Feature Film National Film Award winners
Films directed by Eeshwar Nivas